Bradshaw Dive (2 August 1865 – 17 April 1946) was a Reform Party Member of Parliament in New Zealand.

He was elected to the Egmont electorate in the 1908 general election, but was defeated in 1911. He later served as Mayor of Tauranga.

Notes

References

1865 births
1946 deaths
Reform Party (New Zealand) MPs
Mayors of Tauranga
Members of the New Zealand House of Representatives
New Zealand MPs for North Island electorates
Unsuccessful candidates in the 1911 New Zealand general election